The 1969 Guards Formula 5000 Championship was a motor racing competition for Formula 5000 cars and cars with unrestricted racing engines of up to 2000cc capacity. The championship was organized in the United Kingdom but also included European rounds. It was the first and only series to carry the Guards Formula 5000 Championship name and the first in a sequence of seven annual European Formula 5000 Championships to be contested between 1969 and 1975. The championship was won by Peter Gethin, driving a McLaren M10A.

Calendar

The championship was contested over twelve rounds.

Points system
Championship points were awarded at each round on a 500-350-250-200-150-125-100-90-80-75-70-65-60-55 basis to the first 14 drivers, with 50 points awarded for each place from 15th to 20th. The final championship placings were determined from the best eight results from the twelve rounds.

Championship standings

The following table lists the top twenty positions in the championship.

References

European Formula 5000 Championship seasons
Guards